Rana sauteri is a species of true frog endemic to Taiwan. It inhabits low-altitude hill forests and the associated streams. It is an endangered species threatened by habitat loss due to agriculture and infrastructure development. Common names recorded for Rana sauteri include Kanshirei Village frog, Taiwan groove-toed frog, Sauter's brown frog, and Taiwan pseudotorrent frog.

Taxonomy
Rana sauteri was first described in 1909 by George Albert Boulenger on the basis of specimens collected on Taiwan by one H. Sauter. Boulenger noted resemblances to Rana japonica and Rana mortenseni (now Hylarana mortenseni) and thought the species bridged part of the gap between Hylorana (now spelled Hylarana) and the Rana temporaria group of species. In 1920, however, Boulenger placed the species in the subgenus Hylorana of the genus Rana. In 1991, Fei and colleagues placed it in a new genus Pseudorana together with Rana sangzhiensis and Rana weiningensis, and in 2000 they even placed it in a genus of its own, Pseudoamolops, because they thought it was more closely related to Amolops frogs than to other species of Pseudorana. However, molecular data place Rana sauteri well within the genus Rana, particularly the Rana temporaria group, and in 2006 Frost and colleagues therefore placed Pseudoamolops sauteri back in Rana.

In 1921, Smith described Rana sauteri var. johnsi as a variety of Rana sauteri from Vietnam. This form, which also occurs in Guangxi (southern China), Laos, Cambodia, and Thailand, has been recognized as a separate species, Rana johnsi (previously Pseudorana johnsi) since 1999. In addition, high-altitude populations of Rana sauteri were recognized as a separate species, Rana multidenticulata, in 1997.

Description
They have a slender body with brown, red brown or dark brown upper surface.

Conservation
There is currently a Sauter's frog conservation project in the Dashanbei area of Hengshan Township (橫山鄉), Hsinchu County.

References

Literature cited

External links
Photo in flickr (under name Pseudoamolops sauteri)

sauteri
Amphibians of Taiwan
Endemic fauna of Taiwan
Amphibians described in 1909
Taxonomy articles created by Polbot